The Faure Islands (68° 06' S, 68° 52' W) are an archipelago west of Palmer Land in Antarctica.

See also
 Dismal Island, the largest of the group.

External links
 Geographical data from the Australian Antarctic Data Centre

Islands of Palmer Land